Pectis humifusa, the yerba de San Juan, is a summer blooming annual plant of the genus Pectis. In the Lesser Antilles, it occurs most frequently in the salt spray zone near the seashore; on some islands, it occurs inland as well. Its floral region is Puerto Rico, The Virgin Islands and Florida.

References

humifusa
Flora of North America